Ronald Lewis is a former professional rugby league footballer who played in the 1940s and 1950s.

Playing career

County honours
Ronald Lewis won a cap for Yorkshire while at Castleford, he played playing  in the 5-10 defeat by Cumberland at Whitehaven's stadium on 27 September 1950.

References

External links
Search for "Lewis" at rugbyleagueproject.org

Living people
Castleford Tigers players
English rugby league players
Place of birth missing (living people)
Rugby league fullbacks
Year of birth missing (living people)
Yorkshire rugby league team players